Catalog album may refer to:
 Greatest hits album
 Top Pop Catalog Albums, a Billboard chart for older albums
 Catalog (album), Tsukiko Amano album

See also 
 Catalog (disambiguation)